South Africa competed at the 1996 Summer Olympics in Atlanta, United States. 84 competitors, 64 men and 20 women, and this was the first South African team marched under the new post-Apartheid flag.

Medalists

Gold
 Josia Thugwane — Athletics, Men's Marathon
 Penny Heyns — Swimming, Women's 100 metres Breaststroke
 Penny Heyns — Swimming, Women's 200 metres Breaststroke

Silver
 Hezekiél Sepeng — Athletics, Men's 800 metres

Bronze
 Marianne Kriel — Swimming, Women's 100 metres Backstroke

Archery

Women

Athletics

Men 

Track and road events

Field events

Women 

Track and road events

Boxing

Men

Canoeing

Sprint 

Women

Cycling

Road 

Men

Women

Track

Sprints

Pursuits

Time trials

Points races

Mountain biking

Women

Field Hockey

Men's tournament

Group B

Classification Matches 9-12

9th place match

Team Roster:
Grant Fulton
Kevin Chree
Gregg Clark
Allistar Fredericks
Gary Boddington
Wayne Graham
Charles Teversham
Brad Michalaro
Matthew Hallowes
Greg Nicol
Craig Fulton
Brian Myburgh
Brad Milne
Shaun Cooke
Craig Jackson
Murray Anderson
Shayla de Carvalho

Judo

Men

Modern Pentathlon

Men

Rowing

Men

Women

Sailing 

Mixed

Shooting

Men

Swimming

Men

Women

Tennis

Men

Women

Wrestling

Men's freestyle

References

sports-reference

Nations at the 1996 Summer Olympics
1996
1996 in South African sport